Han Lei (born February 23, 1968), also known in Mongolian as Senbor, is a Chinese folk and pop singer-songwriter.

Music Appearance 
Han rose to prominence in 1997 on the CCTV New Year's Gala, performing a song called "1997, A.D." (公元一九九七); in 1998 he returned to the Gala to perform "Zou Sifang" (走四方), one of the most memorable performances in the song and dance category of the Gala that year, which became his signature hit and propelled him to national stardom. He has since appeared on the Gala six more times, the most recent performance in the 2014 show.

Han has also recorded introductory and conclusion theme songs for various Chinese TV Series, including the introductory theme to Kangxi Dynasty and The Emperor in Han Dynasty, "Xiang Tian Zai Jie Wu Bai Nian" (向天在借五百年). He also performed the main theme "I'll Go with you to the Ends of the Earth" (跟着你到天边) in the Zhang Yimou film Coming Home.

Han also participated in the second season of Hunan Television show I Am a Singer (now Singer) in 2014 and won; he was the first solo singer to win (the precedent, Yu Quan, was a duet performer), and Han remained as the only male solo winning singer until Liu Huan five seasons later.

Personal life
Han was born February 23, 1968, and raised in Hohhot, Inner Mongolia. He is of Mongol descent through his mother, and Han Chinese descent through his father. Han was currently a member of the Honorary Chairperson of the "Inner Mongol's Youth League" (内蒙古青联). He has a son and a daughter. Han married to Wang Yan in 2007.

Sources and References

External links

Baidu Music Profile

Chinese male singers
1968 births
Living people
Singers from Inner Mongolia
People from Hohhot